Say Goodbye, Maggie Cole is a 1972 American made-for-television drama film directed by Jud Taylor and starring Susan Hayward, Darren McGavin, Michael Constantine, Michele Nichols, Dane Clark, Beverly Garland and Jeanette Nolan.

Plot
A widowed doctor (Susan Hayward) joins a colleague's (Darren McGavin) Chicago slum clinic and befriends a dying girl.

Cast
 Susan Hayward as Dr Maggie Cole
 Darren McGavin as Dr Lou Grazzo
 Michael Constantine as Dr Sweeney
 Michele Nichols as Lisa Downey
 Dane Clark as Hank Cooper
 Beverly Garland as Myrna Anderson
 Jeanette Nolan as Mrs Downey
 Maidie Norman as Fergy—Nurse Ferguson
 Richard Anderson as Dr Ben Cole
 Frank Puglia as Mr. Alissandro
 Harry Basch as Isadore Glass
 Leigh Adams as Night Nurse #1
 Jan Peters as Ivan Dvorsky
 Robert Cleaves as Brig
 Richard Carlyle as Mr. Anderson
 Mina Martinez as Night Nurse #2
 Peter Hobbs as Pathologist 
 Guy Remsen as Policeman
 Jerrie Woolen as Day Nurse #2
 Bob Bennett as Waiter
 Virginia Hawkins as Day Nurse #1
 Scott Edmonds as Barney

Production
It was meant to be the first of three pictures Hayward was to make for Aaron Spelling. Dusty Springfield recorded an original song for the film, believed to be only the second time this had been done for a TV movie.

See also
 List of American films of 1972

References

External links

1972 television films
1972 films
1972 drama films
ABC Movie of the Week
Films produced by Aaron Spelling
Films directed by Jud Taylor
Films scored by Hugo Montenegro
American drama television films
1970s American films